Harold Snieder (born May 30, 1965) is a Dutch genetic epidemiologist and professor in the Department of Epidemiology of University Medical Center Groningen, where he also leads the Unit of Genetic Epidemiology and Bioinformatics.

References

External links
Faculty page

Living people
1965 births
Dutch epidemiologists
Genetic epidemiologists
Vrije Universiteit Amsterdam alumni
Academic staff of the University of Groningen